A dwarf cat is a domestic cat with dwarfism due to rare genetic mutations causing a disproportionate feline body and significant health problems. Unlike undersized cats of normal proportions, dwarf cats suffer from the genetic mutations osteochondrodysplasia and achondroplasia (a form of osteochondrodysplasia). These genetic disorders of bone and cartilage are  typically manifested as abnormal bone shape, poor growth or lack of growth, bowing of the limbs to the side – front legs are more likely to be affected, and spinal malformations.

Characteristics 
The dwarf cat is recognized by its characteristically short legs, they are chondrodysplastic and have much shorter and thicker legs than the average cat. Because of their health problems and abnormal bone growth, these cats typically lead a shorter life of 12–15 years. Cats with dwarfism have become significantly popular, and breeding dwarf cats has been viewed as unethical due to the lifelong health results. The term "dwarf cat" is incorrectly applied to cats such as Toy and Teacup Persians which, though small, are breeds of normal feline proportions.  In regards to behavior, dwarf cats may be no different from the average cat. They can be playful, curious, and fast.

Genetics 
To determine of a cat has feline dwarfism, X-rays, bone samples, and genetic testing can be done. Genetic testing on cats with feline dwarfism is being utilized in human research as well.

Felis Catus 9.0, a reference genome for the cat, was utilized in research to analyze DNA of cats using genome sequencing, genetic linkage, origin of the parents, and genome-wide association studies. Each of these approaches yielded the result of the dwarfism phenotype resting within the area of the B1 chromosome in the cat. An unidentified novel gene was also discovered that controls disproportionate dwarfism. The test requires a sample of blood or a buccal swab to provide the DNA. Different cats are compared to determine if the dwarfism is proportionate or disproportionate. Cats with disproportionate dwarfism are more common and aside from leg deformities, the cat is not known to have many more health problems.

Testing 
There are many tests that can be run on cats; feline immunodeficiency virus (FIV) and feline leukemia virus (FeLV) tests, heartworm tests, fecal tests, blood tests, etc. Depending on the problems a cat is exhibiting, or what concerns the pet owners may have, different, more advanced tests may be ordered. If a cat is showing signs of feline dwarfism, specific testing can be done to determine if dwarfism is the cause, or if another condition, such as congenital feline hypothyroidism, is causing symptoms similar to feline dwarfism.

Congenital feline hypothyroidism 
Dwarfism has the potential to be mistaken as congenital feline hypothyroidism. Signs such as disproportionate dwarfism, skeletal abnormalities, and mental disabilities point to both dwarfism and hypothyroidism. Because of this, proper testing can determine whether the cat is showing signs of hypothyroidism or if there is a deeper issue.

A blood test measures the levels of thyroid-stimulating hormone (TSH) in the cat can be performed to rule out feline dwarfism. The test checks the levels of the thyroid hormones thyroxine (T4) and triiodothyronine (T3) and will determine if the cat has hypothyroidism, or if further testing needs to be done to come to a different diagnosis.

In 2018, a study was performed on a 10-month-old kitten showing signs of disproportionate dwarfism. Testing was performed on the (TSH), which confirmed hypothyroidism in the kitten. The kitten was prescribed thyroid hormone supplementation and after 22 months, presented as an average, healthy cat. Once diagnosed, thyroid hormone supplementation should start as early as possible.

Breeds 
The Munchkin cat, also known as the Napoleon, is breed of cat characterized by its short legs. The Munchkin is the original breed of dwarf cats. The International Cat Association (TICA) gave recognition to the Munchkin as a breed in 1994, Minuet cats are very similar and the name is often used interchangeably with the Napoleon. The Minuet is a cross between the Persian and the Munchkin. The Munchkin is approximately three inches shorter than the average cat. The deformities can lie anywhere in the front legs, affecting the humerus, radius and ulna, and the back legs, affecting the femur, tibia and fibula.

The Munchkin has grown significantly in popularity, but due to ethical concerns, the breed has been banned from registration in show registries, and is therefore primarily bred in the US. Other proposed breeds like the Skookum and Bambino have not been given recognition, although a Sphynx–Munchkin hybrid, the Minskin, is under study. Four other breeds include the Lambkin and the Kinkalow, the Genetta and the Scottish Kilt.

Recognition and controversy 
Unlike TICA, most cat registries and pet associations do not recognize any dwarf cat as a legitimate breed. The animals are excluded from most major pet shows and contests. Largely an American phenomenon, they are not widely accepted outside of the United States. In its registration rules, the Fédération Internationale Féline prohibits breeds based on dwarfism, and specifically mentions the Munchkin as an example of unacceptable manipulation of "genetic disease". They are effectively banned under the European Convention for the Protection of Pet Animals and have been strongly condemned in the British magazine Cat World. In the US itself, the ASPCA admonishes its supporters to "stay vigilant" against the small but spreading market.

See also 
 Grumpy Cat 
 Lil Bub

References

External links 
Short-Legged Cat Breeds

Cat breeds and types with short legs